Casuaria catocalis is a species of snout moth in the genus Casuaria. It was described by Émile Louis Ragonot in 1891, and is known from Panama.

References

Moths described in 1891
Chrysauginae